Portrait of a Young Man is a late 16th-century three-quarter length portrait painting of an unidentified young nobleman, possibly from the House of Della Rovere and the court of Pesaro, Italy. It is one of the relatively few portrait paintings by the precursor of Baroque painting, Federico Barocci. The work is now in the Musée des Beaux-Arts of Strasbourg, France. Its inventory number is 1658.

The painting was bought in 1942 from Hans Wendland by the Generalverwaltung der oberrheinischen Museen (General administration of the Upper Rhine museums), in Paris. It was then thought to be a work by Giovanni Battista Moroni, and later attributed to Alonso Sánchez Coello (because of the "Spanish" aspect of the young man's costume), but since 1965 and the case made by Michel Laclotte, it is recognized as a work by Federico Barocci. Portrait of a Young Man is considered as one of the most outstanding portraits in the Strasbourg collection.

References

Paintings in the collection of the Musée des Beaux-Arts de Strasbourg
1580s paintings
Paintings by Federico Barocci
16th-century portraits
Renaissance paintings
Oil on canvas paintings
Portraits of men